Andrew Harrison may refer to:

 Andrew Harrison (actor) (born 1957), English actor
 Andrew Harrison (Alamo defender)
 Andrew Harrison (basketball) (born 1994), American basketball player
 Andrew Harrison (British army officer) (born 1967)
 Andrew Harrison (businessman) (born 1970), British businessman
 Andrew Harrison (journalist), English music journalist
 Andrew Harrison (scientist), CEO of Diamond Light Source
 Andrew Harrison (wheelchair rugby) (born 1987), Australian wheelchair rugby player
 Andy Harrison (born 1957), businessman